The 2005 Six Nations Championship was the sixth Six Nations Championship played since the competition expanded in 2000 to include Italy. Including the Home Nations and Five Nations Championships, this was the 111th season of the tournament.

Wales won the Grand Slam, their first since 1978, and in doing so became the first team ever to win a Grand Slam playing more games away than at home.

Participants
The teams involved were:

Squads

Table
Match winners received two points, with one for a draw and none for a loss. The first tiebreaker was points difference.

Results

Round 1

 This was Scotland's narrowest defeat at Stade de France in the Championship until 2017.
 This was Yann Delaigue's first match in the Championship since 1995.

 This was Wales' first victory against England since 1999.
 This was England's first defeat in the opening game in the Six Nations.
 This was England's first defeat in the opening game in the Championship since 1998.
 This was England's first defeat ever at Millennium Stadium.
 Shane Williams scored his first try ever against England.

Round 2

 This was Italy's biggest defeat against Wales at Stadio Flaminio.

 This was England's first defeat against France at Twickenham Stadium since 1997.
 This is England's narrowest defeat in the Championship.
 Dimitri Yachvili scored 18 points beating Gérald Merceron's 14 points in 2001. This was the record against England until 2016.

Round 3

 This is the first time England lost the first three games in the Championship since 1987.

Round 4

 This was the first hat-trick in the Six Nations since Jason Robinson against Italy in 2004.

Round 5

 This was Wales' first victory against Ireland since 2000.
 This was Wales' first victory against Ireland at the Millennium Stadium.
 This was Wales' first Grand Slam since 1978.
 This was Wales' first Triple Crown since 1988.

Scorers

External links

RBS 6 Nations
2005 Six Nations Championship Coverage at the Guardian

 
2005 rugby union tournaments for national teams
2005
2004–05 in European rugby union
2004–05 in Irish rugby union
2004–05 in English rugby union
2004–05 in Welsh rugby union
2004–05 in Scottish rugby union
2004–05 in French rugby union
2004–05 in Italian rugby union
February 2005 sports events in Europe
March 2005 sports events in Europe